Kommonyan "Ko" Quaye (born May 11, 1987) is a former American football defensive tackle. He played college football at South Dakota.

Professional career

Jacksonville Jaguars
Quaye was signed as a undrafted free agent for the Jacksonville Jaguars in 2010. He was cut on September 4, 2010, but was signed to the Jaguars' practice squad on September 5, 2010. On October 6, 2010, Quaye was waived from the Jaguars' practice squad.

Buffalo Bills
Quaye was signed to the Buffalo Bills' practice squad on November 24, 2010.

Cleveland Browns
On December 23, 2010, Quaye was signed off the Bills practice squad to the Cleveland Browns' active roster.

Edmonton Eskimos
Quaye signed by the Edmonton Eskimos on February 13, 2012, but was released with the final roster cuts on June 23, 2012.

Chicago Rush
Quaye was assigned to the Chicago Rush of the Arena Football League for the 2013 season.

Philadelphia Soul
The Rush traded Quaye to the Philadelphia Soul on March 13, 2013 before ever playing a game with the Rush.

References

1987 births
Living people
American football defensive tackles
Buffalo Bills players
Cleveland Browns players
Edmonton Elks players
Jacksonville Jaguars players
Chicago Rush players
Philadelphia Soul players
Tampa Bay Storm players
People from Brooklyn Park, Minnesota
Players of American football from Minnesota
South Dakota Coyotes football players
Orlando Predators players
Sportspeople from Monrovia